Alimansi Kadogo (born February 5, 1982) is a Ugandan retired football midfielder, who played for ATRACO FC and the Uganda national football team.

Kadogo played for Police F.C. of Rwanda, helping the club to a second-place finish in the 2011–12 Rwanda National Football League and qualification to the 2013 CAF Confederation Cup.

References

External links

1982 births
Living people
Ugandan footballers
Uganda international footballers
Ugandan expatriate sportspeople in Rwanda
Association football midfielders
APR F.C. players
Expatriate footballers in Rwanda
SC Villa players
Kampala Capital City Authority FC players
ATRACO F.C. players